Black Sails is an American dramatic adventure television series set on New Providence Island and a prequel to Robert Louis Stevenson's novel Treasure Island. The series was created by Jonathan E. Steinberg and Robert Levine for Starz and debuted online for free on YouTube and other various streaming platform and video on demand services on January 18, 2014. The debut on cable television followed a week later on January 25, 2014. Steinberg is executive producer, alongside Michael Bay, Brad Fuller and Andrew Form, while Michael Angeli, Doris Egan, and Levine are co-executive producers.

The following is a list of characters that appeared on the television series.

Main 

 Toby Stephens as James McGraw/Flint: Captain of the Walrus and the Spanish Man O' War.
 Hannah New as Eleanor Guthrie: Chief Fence and Supplier in Nassau.
 Luke Arnold as "Long" John Silver: Cook and later Quartermaster of the Walrus and the Spanish Man O' War.
 Jessica Parker Kennedy as Max: Prostitute and later Brothel madame in Nassau.
 Tom Hopper as William "Billy Bones" Manderly: First mate of the Walrus and the Spanish Man O' War.
 Zach McGowan as Charles Vane: Captain of the Ranger and the Fancy, Steward of Fort Nassau. (seasons 1–3)
 Toby Schmitz as Jack Rackham: Quartermaster of the Ranger and later Brothel manager and Captain of the Colonial Dawn.
 Clara Paget as Anne Bonny: Crew Mate of the Ranger and later of the Colonial Dawn.
 Mark Ryan as Hal Gates: Quartermaster of the Walrus and Captain of the Ranger. (season 1)
 Hakeem Kae-Kazim as Mr. Scott: Adviser to Eleanor Guthrie and Captain Benjamin Hornigold and later Quartermaster of the Spanish Man O' War. (seasons 1–3)
 Sean Cameron Michael as Richard Guthrie: Father to Eleanor and one of the richest merchants in the New World. (seasons 1–2)
 Louise Barnes as Miranda Hamilton/Barlow: Resident of New Providence and Flint's friend and confidant. (seasons 1–3)
 Rupert Penry-Jones as Thomas Hamilton: Son of Lord Proprietor Alfred Hamilton, from London. (seasons 2, 4)
 Luke Roberts as Woodes Rogers: English Captain determined to end piracy in Nassau for good. (seasons 3–4)
 Ray Stevenson as Edward Teach: Captain of the Queen Anne's Revenge. (seasons 3–4)
 David Wilmot as Israel Hands: Bounty hunter. (season 4)
 Harriet Walter as Marion Guthrie: Mother to Richard Guthrie and grandmother to Eleanor Guthrie. (season 4)

Recurring 
 Lawrence Joffe as Randall: Cook of the Walrus and the Spanish Man O' War. (seasons 1–2)
 Jannes Eiselen (season 1) and Roland Reed (seasons 2–3) as Dufresne: Accountant and later Quartermaster of the Walrus, the Spanish Man O' War and the Orion.
 Dylan Skews as Logan: Armorer of the Walrus and the Spanish Man O' War. (seasons 1–2)
 Lise Slabber as Idelle: Prostitute of the brothel run by Noonan and Jack Rackham in Nassau.
 Richard Lukunku as Joshua: Crew Mate of the Walrus and the Spanish Man O' War. (seasons 1–2)
 Winston Chong as Joji: Crew Mate of the Walrus and the Spanish Man O' War.
 Alistair Moulton Black as Dr. Howell: Doctor of the Walrus and the Spanish Man O' War. (seasons 1–3; guest season 4)
 David Butler as Frasier: Appraiser in Nassau. (seasons 1–2, 4)
 Fiona Ramsay as Mrs. Mapleton: Madam of the brothel run by Noonan in Nassau. (seasons 1, 3; guest seasons 2, 4)
 Graham Weir as Captain Naft: Captain of the Intrepid. (season 1; guest season 2)
 Patrick Lyster as Benjamin Hornigold: Steward of Fort Nassau and Captain of the Royal Lion and the Orion. (seasons 1–3)
 Mark Elderkin as Pastor Lambrick: Head of the local church in Nassau. (seasons 1–2; guest seasons 3–4)
 Andre Jacobs as De Groot: Master of the Walrus and the Spanish Man O' War.
 Karl Thaning as O'Malley: Mercenary working for Eleanor Guthrie. (season 1; guest season 2)
 Richard Wright-Firth as Muldoon: Gunner of the Walrus and the Spanish Man O' War. (seasons 1–2; guest season 3)
 John Herbert as Geoffrey Lawrence: Captain of the Black Hind. (season 1; guest season 2)
 Laudo Liebenberg as Dooley: Crew Mate of the Walrus and the Spanish Man O' War. (season 2–4)
 David Dukas as Captain Hume: Commander of the Royal Navy's Scarborough. (season 2; guest season 1)
 Sibongile Mlambo as Eme: Slave aboard the Andromache. (season 2; guest seasons 1, 3–4)
 Patrick Lavisa as Babatunde: Slave aboard the Andromache. (season 2; guest season 1)
 Craig Jackson as Augustus Featherstone: Quartermaster of the Colonial Dawn. (season 2–4)
 Calvin Hayward as Wayne (season 3; guest season 2)
 Anna-Louise Plowman as Mrs. Hudson: English chambermaid in the employ of Woodes Rogers. (seasons 3–4)
 Aidan Whytock as Jacob Garrett: Carpenter's Mate on the Intrepid. (seasons 3–4; guest season 2)
 Wilson Carpenter as Ellers (seasons 3–4)
 Craig Hawks as Reuben (seasons 3–4)
 Moshidi Motshegwa as The Maroon Queen: Mr. Scott's wife and Madi's mother. (seasons 3–4)
 Zethu Dlomo as Madi: Mr. Scott's daughter. (seasons 3–4)
 Chris Fisher as Ben Gunn: Crew Mate of the Walrus. (seasons 3–4)
 Andrian Mazive as Kofi (seasons 3–4)
 Rory Acton Burnell as Colin (season 4; guest season 3)
 Adam Neill as Mr. Soames (season 4; guest season 3)

Season 1 
 Jeremy Crutchley as Morley: Crew Mate of the Walrus.
 Neels Clasen as Hamund: Crew Mate of the Ranger.
 Langley Kirkwood as Dyfed Bryson: Captain of the Andromache.
 Dean McCoubrey as Hayes: Quartermaster of the Andromache.
 Garth Collins as Albinus: Former pirate and Head of a timber business.

Season 2 
 Tadhg Murphy as Ned Low: Captain of the Fancy.
 Nic Rasenti as Mr. Holmes: Crew Mate of the Fancy.
 Robert Hobbs as Jenks: Pirate under the command of Charles Vane.
 Meganne Young as Abigail Ashe: Daughter of Lord Peter Ashe.
 Adrian Collins as Vincent: Crew Mate of the Spanish Man O' War.
 Tyrel Meyer as Nicholas: Crew Mate of the Spanish Man O' War.
 Nick Boraine as Lord Peter Ashe: Governor of the Carolina Colony.
 Danny Keogh as Lord Proprietor Alfred Hamilton: Thomas' father.
 Lars Arentz-Hansen as Colonel William Rhett: Subordinate of Peter Ashe in Charleston.

Season 3 
 Jenna Saras and Greig Rogers as Death: a dark figure that appears in Flint's visions alongside Miranda.
 Richard Lothian as Dobbs: Crew Mate of the Walrus.
 Jason Cope as Captain Chamberlain: Commodore of the Royal Navy.
 Dan Robbertse as Captain Throckmorton
 Siv Ngesi as Udo
 Francis Chouler as Lieutenant Perkins: Officer of the Royal Navy.
 Garth Breytenbach as Major Rollins
 Wayne Harrison as Doctor Marcus

Season 4 
 Chris Larkin as Captain Berringer: Officer of the Royal Navy and Rogers's second in command.
 Dale Jackson as Lieutenant Utley: Officer of the Royal Navy.
 Clyde Berning as Lieutenant Kendrick: Officer of the Royal Navy.
 Mike Westcott as Judge Adams: Magistrate in Nassau.
 Milton Schorr as Lieutenant Burrell: Officer of the Royal Navy.
 Sizo Mahlangu as Obi
 Tinah Mnumzana as Ruth: Slave at Underhill estate.
 Apolinhalo Antonio as Zaki
 Tony Kgoroge as Julius: Slave at Edwards estate.
 Anton Dekker as Tom Morgan
 Theo Landey as First Mate Molin

Notable guest characters
 Kelly Wragg as Alice: Prostitute of the brothel run by Noonan and Jack Rackham in Nassau. (seasons 1–2)
 Russel Savadier as Underhill: Merchant and landowner on New Providence Island. (seasons 2–4)
 Nick Rebelo as Rawls (seasons 2, 4)
 James Alexander (season 3) and Jorge Suquet (season 4) as Juan Antonio Grandal: An agent of the Spanish intelligence.
 Nevena Jablanovic as Georgia (seasons 3–4)

Season 1
 Anthony Bishop as Singleton: Crew Mate of the Walrus.
 Toni Caprari as Noonan: Brothel owner in Nassau.
 Quentin Krog as Turk: Crew Mate of the Walrus.
 Frans Hamman as Slade: Crew Mate of the Ranger.
 Jarrid Geduld as Crisp: Crew Mate of the Walrus.
 Graham Clarke as Captain Lilywhite: Opponent to the Guthries.

Season 2
 Brendan Murray as Meeks: Former Quartermaster of the Fancy.
 Greg Melvill-Smith as Hennessey: Admiral of the Royal Navy.
 Angelique Pretorius as Charlotte: Prostitute of the brothel run by Jack Rackham in Nassau.
 Martin Van Geems as Larson
 Craig MacRae as Yardley: Pirate under the command of Charles Vane.

Season 3
 Martin Munro as Palmer
 Gideon Lombard as Warren

Season 4
 Mary-Anne Barlow as Margaret Underhill
 Luka Goodall as Audrey Underhill
 Jason Delplanque as Lieutenant Werth: Officer of the Royal Navy.
 Ilay Kurelovic as Governor Raja: Commander of the Spanish Fleet.
 Jose Domingos as Mr. Oliver
 Guy Paul as Joseph Guthrie: Father to Richard Guthrie and grandfather to Eleanor Guthrie.
 Tyrone Keogh as Adams
 Ron Smerczak as Mr. McCoy
 Cara Roberts as Mark Read

Appearances 
  = Main cast (credited) 
  = Recurring cast (3+)
  = Guest cast (1-2)

References 

Lists of action television characters
Lists of American drama television series characters